USS Ortolan (ASR-22), a twin-hulled submarine rescue ship, laid down 28 August 1968 by the Alabama Drydock and Shipbuilding Company, Mobile, Alabama; launched 10 September 1969; sponsored by Mrs. Nels C. Johnson; and was commissioned 14 July 1973.

Ortolan was designed to operate the s, and was the second and final vessel of the  built by the United States Navy.

Decommissioned 30 March 1995 and berthed at the James River reserve fleet, Fort Eustis, Virginia, awaiting final determination for method of disposal.

Ortolan was awarded as part of a recycling contract to Esco Marine of Brownsville, Texas on 3 July 2009 and departed the James River Reserve Fleet on 20 July 2009 for recycling.

See also 
 Deep Submergence Rescue Vehicle

References 
 USS Ortolan (ASR 22)

 USS Ortolan leaves Ghost Fleet

External links 
  NavSource Online: Service Ship Photo Archive ASR-22 Ortolan
 Ortolan Trials
 Report on the USS Ortolan (ASR-22) Forward Foil Seakeeping Trials
 USS Ortolan (ASR-22) Standardization Trial Results
 Operation Enduring Service Photo Album :: USS Ortolan (ASR-22)
 Ortolan (ASR-22) – RC Groups
 US Navy Surface Auxiliary, and Service Ship Insignia
 Ships & Submarines
 

Pigeon-class submarine rescue ships
Ships built in Mobile, Alabama
1969 ships